Lajos Nagy (5 February 1883 – 28 October 1954) was a Hungarian writer. His work covered a number of genres, including travel literature. "He came up with his brief, humoristic stories about animals in the beginning of the 1920s and in 1922 a collection of these short humoresques was published under the title Nonsensical Natural History (Képtelen természetrajz)." He joined the Hungarian Communist Party in 1945 and is considered to be one of the prominent writers in the style of socialist realism in Hungary.

Awards
Baumgarten Prize (1932, 1935 and 1938)
Kossuth Prize (1948)

Selected works 
 Három magyar város (Three Hungarian towns) (1933)
 Kiskunhalom (1934)

References

1883 births
1954 deaths
Hungarian writers